A referendum on the voting system was held in San Marino on 3 August 2003. The proposed change would have reduced the number of preferential votes from three to one. Although it was approved by 80.72% of voters, the number voting in favour (8,755) did not pass the required quorum of 32% of all registered voters (10,105).

Background
The original proposal was to only reduce the number of preferential votes for overseas voters. However, the Electoral Tribunal ruled on 10 June 2003, that this was inadmissible, as it differentiated between voters in the country and abroad.

Results

References

San Marino voting system referendum
Referendums in San Marino
Voting system referendum
San Marino voting system referendum